Alessandro Milesi (born 21 December 1999) is a Peruvian professional footballer currently playing as a defender or midfielder for Club Atlético Grau in Piura, a team competing in Peruvian First Division.

Career

He spent two years with the under-19 team of Brescia. During the 2018–19 season, Milesi trained with Brescia's senior squad and was named to the bench for two Serie B matches.

In February 2019 he was loaned to Sicula Leonzio in Serie C, making two appearances against Vibonese and Casertana.

In September 2019 he signed a three-month contract with Miami FC in the newly-formed National Independent Soccer Association.

In July 2020 he signed a one-year contract with Sliema Wanderers in the Maltese Premier League where he played 23 matches and scored two goasl.

In 2021 he signed for San Martin in Lima Peru where he had 5 appeareances before suffering an ACL rupture.

In December 15, 2022 he joined Club Atlético Grau in Piura, a team which competes in Peruvian 1st Division.

International career

Alessandro was born in Lima, Peru, to Italian parents and spent most of his life in the United States. Consequently, he holds Peruvian, Italian and American nationality.

He was part of the Peru under-15 side that won the gold medal in the 2014 Youth Olympics. He also appeared for the Peru under-20 team at the 2019 South American Youth Football Championship.

Career statistics

Club

Notes

References

1999 births
Living people
Peruvian footballers
Italian footballers
American soccer players
Association football defenders
Esther Grande footballers
Brescia Calcio players
Miami FC players
Serie C players
Footballers from Lima
Peruvian people of Italian descent